Kokhav Nolad 7 is season 7 of an Israeli reality television competition Kokhav Nolad aimed at finding new solo singing talent. It debuted on May 24, 2009, and was broadcast twice a week, ending August 30, 2009.

An addition to the new season, of the show, was transsexual singer and former Eurovision Song Contest winner Dana International, who joined the show as a judge, fifth in the panel that includes composer Svika Pik, singer Margalit Tsanani, director and choreographer Tsedi Tsarfati, plus writer and music critic Gal Uchovsky. The show's host as usual was comedian Zvika Hadar.

Auditions were held in Israel in Tel Aviv, Beersheba, and Haifa. While in Kokhav Nolad 6, auditions were also held in India; this time the judges went to find singers in the Americas. The finale was broadcast live from Eilat.

The average age of the seventh season was remarkably low, because many of the contestants had not finished high school when the show aired.

Although the show is mostly dedicated to Israeli and Hebrew music, this year the participants were allowed to sing some songs in Arabic, English, Russian and Spanish.

On August 23, the finalists were announced to be Mei Finegold, Vladi Blayberg and Roni Dalumi. Dalumi won the competition with 61% of the votes.

Participants

 * – asterisk (*) means eliminated.

The Episodes and songs performed
Below are the episodes.

First Solo Week

Performances were held on June 28 and June 29, live from Herzliya TV studios, the same venue since the fourth season. 11 participants performed on each day. Judges ranking was 25% of the final result.

Sunday, June 28th

Paula aVlstein was awarded the best performance of the night. Yarden Geraffi and Aya Zehavi Fayglin were eliminated.

Monday, June 29th

Mei Finegold was awarded the best performance of the night. Ido Geraffi and Adi Cohen were eliminated, but won "Hatsilu, Ani Kokhav Nolad!" (see below) and could come back to the show. Finegold was awarded best weekly performance.

Second Solo Week

Performances were held on July 5 and July 6 from Herzliya TV studios. 9 participants performed each day. Judges ranking was 25% of the final result.

Sunday, July 5th

Hovi Sekulets was awarded the best performance of the night. During the show, Israel Bar-On, winner of Kokhav Nolad 6, performed. Tomer Yeshayahu was eliminated.

Monday, July 6th

Paula Valstein was awarded the best performance of the night for the second week in a row. During the show, Harel Skaat, the runner-up of the 2nd season, performed. Sagi Ossi was eliminated. Hovi was awarded best weekly performance.

Third Week

July 12 and July 13. Sunday was a duet evening. Judges' ranking of the duets was 40% of the result, after which 6 pairs qualified to Monday's show, and 4 contestants performing "rescue solos", with 25% judges ranking of the final result. One of the four was eliminated.

The pairs for Sunday show were as such:

Hovi & Elchai Refoua and Omer & Moran awarded the best performance of the night and therefore they are automatically qualified for next week's show. Bottom 2 were Mei Feingold, Daniel Tavori, Oshri Elmorish and Amor Amosi. All 4 sang rescue solos. These were:

Amor Amosi was eliminated from the show.

Monday, July 13th
The second night was dedicated to the Israeli writer, lyricist and poet Ehud Manor who died just a few years ago. This night all participants performed with songs Manor was partner in. Out of 11 performances, two participants would be eliminated this show. Judges ranking was 25% of the final result.

Mazal Picado and Oshri Elmorish were eliminated.

Fourth Week

Were held on July 19 and July 20. The first night was an unthemed duets night, while the bottom two would go up in the end to do 'rescue solos' where the audience would choose which 1 of the 4 will leave the show. As there are 13 participants in the show, a trio was selected to perform. Judges ranking of the duets was 40% and that of the rescue solos was 25% of the final result.

Sunday, July 19th
The pairs for Sunday show were as such:

Vladi & Moran and Omer, Hovi & Re'em, Mei & Roni and Elchai & Liran qualified for Monday's show. Bottom 2 were Daniel, Or, Paula and Daniel. All 4 sang rescue solos. These were:

Or Kollenberg was eliminated from the show.

During the show Gidi Gov performed.

Monday, July 20th

Was an 1980s-themed special. During the show the Pet Shop Boys perform, a day after they landed in Israel. Judges ranking was 25% of the final result. 12 performances were held, in the following order:

Elchai Refoua was eliminated from the show.

Fifth Week

Was held on July 26 and July 27. The first week was where all participants performed every night. The first night was an unthemed duets night, while the bottom two went to go up in the end to do 'rescue solos' where the audience would choose which 1 of the 4 will leave the show. As there are 11 participants in the show, a trio was selected to perform. Judges ranking of the duets was 40% and that of the rescue solos was 25% of the final result.

Sunday, July 26th
The pairs for Sunday show were as such:

Vladi & Omer, Mei & Hovi and Moran & Re'em qualified for Monday's show. Bottom 2 were Daniel Tavori, Daniel Barzilay, Liran, Paula and Roni. All 5 sang rescue solos. These were:

Daniel Barzilay was eliminated from the show.

During the show performed Boaz Mauda, winner of the 5th season who released a new album.

Monday, July 27th

Was an Idan Raichel special. During the show his  project performed. Judges ranking was 25% of the final result. 10 performances were held, in the following order:

Hovi Sekulets was eliminated from the show.

Sixth Week

Was held on August 2 and August 3. The first week was where all participants performed every night. The first night's theme was Songs of Shlomi Shabat featuring Shlomi singing with the contestants, while the second night featured songs of Kdam Eurovisions, Israel's traditional show for choosing a Eurovision song. Judges ranking was 25% of the final result.

Sunday, August 2nd

At the end of the night, Paula Valstein was eliminated.

Monday, August 3rd

Reem Cohen was eliminated.

Seventh Week

Was held on August 9 and August 10. This week Reem Cohen and Hovi Sekuletz who were voted off by the audience, were chosen by the audience to re-enter the competition. The first night's theme was Songs of Gidi Gov, while the second night was Songs of the Yehudim. Judges ranking was 25% of the final result.

Sunday, August 9th

At the end of the night, Daniel Tavori was eliminated.

Sunday, August 10th

At the end of the night, Hovi Sekulets was eliminated. Mei was awarded best weekly performance.

Eighth Week

The 8th week episodes were held on August 16 and August 17. The first night was regular duet night, while the second night featured songs of Aviv Geffen and performances with him and his ensemble. Judges ranking of the duets was 40%, and that of the solo rescues was 25% of the final result.

Sunday, August 16th

On that evening judge Dana International assigned the nickname "Tifrak'hat HaDaloomi" (The Inflorescence of The Daloomi) to participant Roni Dalumi, a nickname which became a common reference on the show and in the media to Dalumi.  Vladi & Liran qualified for Monday's show. Bottom 4 were Roni, Moran, Re'em and Mey. All sang rescue solos. These were:

Re'em Cohen was eliminated.

Monday, August 17th

Moran Mazuz was eliminated. Mei Finedolg was awarded best weekly performance, but chose to give her award (a video clip filmed by cellular cameras) to her friend and competitor Roni Dalumi. After Moran was eliminated, Mei gave her the award instead.

Semi-final

Sunday, August 23rd

At the semi-final, Liran Danino, Roni Dalumi, Mei Finegold and Vladi Blayberg competed with two numbers each: an up-tempo song, and a quiet song. Judges ranking was 25% of the final result.

In one of the most shocking twists in the history of Kokhav Nolad, the judges' favorite Liran Danino was voted off by the audience, despite being ranked first by the judges. Roni Dalumi who was ranked last by the judges, got first in the audience voting and qualified to the final in Eilat, along with Vladi Blayberg and Mei Finegold.

The Final

Sunday, August 30th

The 7th final of the show included two separate rounds of solo performances. After the first round, someone was to be voted off. The remaining two competed in a "head-to-head" combat. The judges rank was 10% of the final result after the first round.

First round performances:

After the first round of performances judges' and media favorite Mei Finegold was voted off by the audience to the obvious dismay and shock of the judges who ranked her first, while competitor Roni Dalumi who was ranked last again by the judges qualified to the second round along with Vladi Blayberg. All polls before the finale showed Mei leading the voting. The difference between the third place (Finegold) and the second (Blayberg) was 1%. The difference between the second place and the first place (Daloomi) was 3% - the closest voting ever in a finale of the show. Finegold was given a chance to perform what was to be her second number (in case she qualified to the second round), an original song which she co-wrote with her own ensemble, as a consolation reward.

Second round performances:

After the second round of performances Daloomi was ranked first by three of the judges, getting her first in the judges ranking for the first and only time during the season, although at this point their ranking had no impact on the final result. Moments later it was announced that the shy girl from the Negev had won the competition with 61% of the audience votes, becoming the youngest winner (being only 17 at the time) and the first female to win the show since first season's winner Ninet Tayeb. More than 900,000 votes were cast during the finale.

The finale ended with  host Tsvika Hadar announcing emotionally that this time "a star was truly born" referring to the inexperienced teen who surprisingly defeated maturer, more experienced and professional singers who competed this year and were favored by the judges. This narrative led the media to refer to her victory as a "Cinderella Story". At a press conference held minutes after her victory when asked about her future plans as newly born star, the humble teen replied she still has to study for her final math exam, thus stabilizing her reputation as she was immediately crowned "Israel's Sweetheart" by the media.

Young Participant / Old Participant 

Participant Paula Valstein who at her audition claimed she was 28 years old turned out to be 32, after her year book picture was found and published by bloggers. Soon after, her age was inexplicably erased from her bio page in the show's website.

Six weeks into the competition, an 18-year-old blogger published in his blog that participant Omer Adam, who became a clear favorite of a major cut of the audience, had lied about his age and is actually 15 years old. The competition rules state that a person must be at least 16 years old, to audition or take part in the competition. If Omer had not lied about his age, he would not have been a part of the season. The blogger found out about Omer's age using a software containing personal information of all Israeli citizens that leaked onto the web from The Ministry of Interior. Days later the production released a statement telling that Omer dropped out of the competition after admitting to giving false information to the production.

Hatsilu, Ani Kokhav Nolad!

Every Thursday, the weekly participants who received the lowest number of votes on the first two nights would have a chance to renter to competition, with the new Channel 24 program "Help! I was born a star" hosted by season 5 runner-up, Marina Maximillian Blumin. Although only one person was supposed to re-enter the competition, after participant Omer Adam had to drop out, two came back - Hovi "Star" Sekulets and Re'em Cohen.

"Ratsiti Lashir"

As from the 3rd season, each edition of Kokhav Nolad is accompanied by a main theme, sung by last season's finalist. For example, the 3rd season theme was "Halomot Mitgashmim" ("Dreams do come true"), composed by Svika Pik and performed by the 3 finalists of Kokhav Nolad 2 (Harel Moyal, Harel Skaat & Adi Cohen), Kokhav Nolad 4 had "Kol Kakh Harbe Shirim" ("So Many Songs"), composed by Yoni Bloch and performed by the 3rd season winner and so on...

For Kokhav Nolad 7, Israeli musician & singer Dudu Tassa made a theme named "Ratsiti Lashir" - simply translated as "I Wanted to Sing". The final versions came up with 3 solo versions for the Kokhav Nolad 6 finalists: winner Israel Bar-On, runner up Lee Biran and Carmel Eckman, who took third place. Each lucky person, to be auditioned, had to know the song by heart, in case he or she would be asked to sing it by the judges.

Live shows

See also
American Idol
Kokhav Nolad

References

Kokhav Nolad seasons
2009 in Israel
2009 in music